Ecological Uprising (EU) was a political and protest movement in Serbia that gained presence during the 2021–2022 Serbian environmental protests. It was led by Aleksandar Jovanović Ćuta, who was elected to the National Assembly of Serbia at the head of We Must (Moramo) coalition in the 2022 Serbian parliamentary election. On 11 June 2022, the movement was merged into a new political party called Together (Zajedno!).

History

Formation 
According to Together's website, the Ecological Uprising was formed in 2019. The Ecological Uprising movement grew out of a series of environmental actions in Serbia in 2021. Jovanović, working with a movement called "Defend the Rivers of Stara Planina," used the phrase "ecological uprising" in his call for a citizens' protest at the national assembly on 10 April 2021. The protest, which drew thousands of people, called for a moratorium on the construction of small hydroelectric plants and for more intensive reforestation across Serbia. Another protest was held in September of the same year, with more than thirty environmental organizations rallied around the "Ecological Uprising" banner. The latter event was the catalyst for an ongoing series of protests of environmental protests over the following months, with Jovanović and Ecological Uprising playing a leading role. The protests came to focus in particular on opposition to Rio Tinto's proposed jadarite mining near the Jadar River.

Jovanović indicated in mid-2021 that he wanted the Ecological Uprising movement to participate in the 2022 Belgrade City Assembly election. Speculation grew as to his possible coalition partners, with both the Do not let Belgrade drown (NDB) group and Nebojša Zelenović's Action movement mentioned as possibilities. In November 2021, Jovanović said that Ecological Uprising would participate in both the Belgrade election and the 2022 Serbian parliamentary election; in so doing, he said that the movement's ultimate goal was to "remove the cause of the biggest pollution in Serbia, which is the regime of Aleksandar Vučić."

2022 election 
Jovanović and Zelenović signed an electional agreement to create a green-left political bloc in November 2021. The We Must coalition was formally launched in January 2022, with NDB and other parties also participating. The We Must coalition ultimately won representation in both the republican and Belgrade assemblies, taking thirteen seats in each body. Jovanović, who led the coalition's electoral list at the republic level, was elected as a parliamentarian.

On 1 June 2022, representatives of Ecological Uprising, the Action movement, and the Assembly of Free Serbia announced that they would henceforth act as one party. The new party, known as Together (Zajedno!), was formally introduced on 11 June, with Jovanović, Zelenović, and Assembly of Free Serbia leader Biljana Stojković as its co-presidents.

Electoral results

Parliamentary elections

Presidential elections

Belgrade City Assembly elections

References

2019 establishments in Serbia
2022 disestablishments in Serbia
Environmental organizations based in Europe
Green political parties in Serbia